Gastromyzon is a genus of gastromyzontid loaches native to Borneo.

Species 
There are currently 36 species recognized in this genus:
 Gastromyzon aequabilis H. H. Tan, 2006
 Gastromyzon aeroides H. H. Tan & Sulaiman, 2006
 Gastromyzon auronigrus H. H. Tan, 2006
 Gastromyzon bario H. H. Tan, 2006
 Gastromyzon borneensis Günther, 1874
 Gastromyzon contractus T. R. Roberts, 1982
 Gastromyzon cornusaccus H. H. Tan, 2006
 Gastromyzon cranbrooki H. H. Tan & Sulaiman, 2006
 Gastromyzon crenastus H. H. Tan & M. U. C. Leh, 2006
 Gastromyzon ctenocephalus T. R. Roberts, 1982
 Gastromyzon danumensis P. K. Chin & Inger, 1989
 Gastromyzon embalohensis Rachmatika, 1998
 Gastromyzon extrorsus H. H. Tan, 2006
 Gastromyzon farragus H. H. Tan & M. U. C. Leh, 2006
 Gastromyzon fasciatus Inger & P. K. Chin, 1961
 Gastromyzon ingeri H. H. Tan, 2006
 Gastromyzon introrsus H. H. Tan, 2006
 Gastromyzon katibasensis M. U. C. Leh & P. K. P. Chai, 2003
 Gastromyzon lepidogaster T. R. Roberts, 1982
 Gastromyzon megalepis T. R. Roberts, 1982
 Gastromyzon monticola (Vaillant, 1889)
 Gastromyzon ocellatus H. H. Tan & P. K. L. Ng, 2004
 Gastromyzon ornaticauda H. H. Tan & Martin-Smith, 1998
 Gastromyzon pariclavis H. H. Tan & Martin-Smith, 1998
 Gastromyzon praestans H. H. Tan, 2006
 Gastromyzon psiloetron H. H. Tan, 2006
 Gastromyzon punctulatus Inger & P. K. Chin, 1961 (Hillstream loach)
 Gastromyzon ridens T. R. Roberts, 1982
 Gastromyzon russulus H. H. Tan, 2006
 Gastromyzon scitulus H. H. Tan & M. U. C. Leh, 2006
 Gastromyzon spectabilis H. H. Tan, 2006
 Gastromyzon stellatus H. H. Tan, 2006
 Gastromyzon umbrus H. H. Tan, 2006
 Gastromyzon venustus H. H. Tan & Sulaiman, 2006
 Gastromyzon viriosus H. H. Tan, 2006
 Gastromyzon zebrinus H. H. Tan, 2006

References 

 
Gastromyzontidae

Taxa named by Albert Günther